Grzegorz Arłukowicz (born 11 February 1992) is a Polish footballer who plays as a midfielder.

References

External links
 

1992 births
Living people
People from Łomża
Sportspeople from Podlaskie Voivodeship
Polish footballers
Association football midfielders
Jagiellonia Białystok players
Kolejarz Stróże players
Zagłębie Sosnowiec players
Polonia Warsaw players
Ekstraklasa players
I liga players
II liga players
III liga players